The Library (lit: Library of Love) is a Thai short film  released in 2013.

Summary
Jim uses the library where Ann work as a librarian. Jim secretly falls in love with Ann at first sight, but the library rule  "Please Quiet" prohibits Jim from talking to Ann. He starts writing letters to Ann on the lending cards of the books he borrowed, without Ann's knowledge. When Jim's ex returns the last book he borrowed, Ann hears that Jim died of liver cancer. As she starts crying with the book in her hand one of her tears fall onto the card causing her to notice the letter written on the other side. 
 Nutcha

Production and release
The Library is a short film produced by Mono Music (in a network of Mono Group) and released on August 29, 2013 at 05:00pm on Zaa Network (present MONO29).

Original soundtrack
Yak Hai Kwam Kid Mee Siang (อยากให้ความคิดมีเสียง; "Silent Thought") by Lakkana Huangmaneerungroj.

References

External links
 
Behind the scenes

2013 films
Thai short films
2013 short films
Thai-language films
Films set in 2006
Films set in 2013